Pearce Wright (1933–2005), was a prominent British science journalist who became Science Editor of The Times.

Biography

Pearce Wright was born in Plymouth on 23 February 1933 and educated at Bedford School before training as a radiologist. He was a journalist with Electronics Weekly, between 1960 and 1966, and joined The Times in 1966 as Technology Reporter. He was Science Editor of The Times between 1974 and 1990. His big, early stories included the Torrey Canyon oil spill, off the Isles of Scilly in 1967, and the Space Race. He was Chairman of the Association of British Science Writers.

Described by the Financial Times as one of the "three giants" of science journalism in his era, Pearce Wright died on 6 May 2005.

References

1933 births
2005 deaths
People educated at Bedford School
British male journalists
Science journalists
British science journalists